Elite Canadian Championship Wrestling (ECCW) (formerly known as NWA: Extreme Canadian Championship Wrestling and Extreme Canadian Championship Wrestling) is a Western Canada-based professional wrestling promotion and a former member of the National Wrestling Alliance. By 2014 it was Canada's largest wrestling promotion. It was the focus of the 2010 documentary This Wrestling Life, and was used as the scene for the independent movie Kayfabe.

International success

Many of Western Canada's brightest and best young talents have either started with ECCW, or used the promotion as a proving ground to build on their own skills and abilities.

Harry Smith (2006, 2014), Tyson Kidd (aka TJ Wilson, 2005, 2006), Natalya Neidhart (as Nattie Neidhart, 2005, 2006), Becky Lynch (as Rebecca Knox, 2005–2006) spent time with ECCW, Tyler Breeze (as Mattias Wilde, 2009–2010), and Tenille Dashwood (as Tenille Tayla 2009-2011) before eventually signing on with the WWE. Knox was the inaugural SuperGirls Champion (now the ECCW Women's Championship),

Kyle O'Reilly appeared in the 2010 edition of the CHIKARA Young Lions Cup before signing a contract with Ring of Honor, where he is a 3-time Tag Team Champion (2013, 2014 with Bobby Fish), and former ROH World Champion (December 2, 2016). He and Fish also held the IWGP Junior Heavyweight Tag Team Championships in 2014 and 2015, and won the Super Jr. Tag Team Tournament in 2014. O'Reilly is a PWG Battle of Los Angeles Winner (2013), and former PWG World Champion (May 23, 2014). In 2016, Pro Wrestling Illustrated rated Kyle O'Reilly at #32 out of the top 500 singles wrestlers in the PWI 500.

Nicole Matthews is a former SHIMMER Champion, and faced then-NXT Women's Champion Asuka in the opening match of the November 30, 2016 edition of WWE NXT in a non-title match.

The Bollywood Boyz defeated Reno Scum in the finals of the GFW Tag Team Championship tournament on October 23, 2015, held in Las Vegas, to become the first GFW Tag Team Champions.  On June 13, 2016, Gurv and Harv were announced as participants in WWE's upcoming Cruiserweight Classic tournament. On June 23, both Sihras were eliminated from the tournament in their first round matches with Gurv losing to Noam Dar and Harv losing to Drew Gulak.

K. C. Spinelli and Tayla were featured on the wrestling-based World of Hurt television show's first season, with K. C. Spinelli, Bishop, Nick Price, "Ravenous" Randy Myers, and Sammy Hall being featured in the second season with WWE Hall of Famer "Rowdy" Roddy Piper.  Hall has credited her nickname "Bambi" coming from her time with Piper. Taya Valkyrie also appeared on both seasons. Valkyrie left for Mexico in 2012, eventually debuting with AAA in November 2012. Valkyrie debuted in Lucha Underground on February 24, 2016 as Taya.  Valkyrie  made her debut on the September 14, 2017 edition of GFW  Impact! defeating Amber Nova.  She made her WWE NXT debut on the April 13, 2021 edition as Franky Monet.

Chelsea Green competed in WWE Tough Enough in 2015, finishing in 7th place. Later that year she signed with Impact Wrestling (Laurel Von Ness).

El Phantasmo debuted in Revolution Pro Wrestling in the United Kingdom on June 6, 2017 and went on to join New Japan Pro Wrestling in 2019 as a member of Bullet Club.

Notable wrestlers

 Scotty Mac
 Christina Von Eerie
 Aaron Idol
 Bobby Sharp 
 Bryan Danielson
 Christopher Daniels
 Davey Richards
 Doink the Clown
 El Phantasmo
 Eric Young
 Gama Singh
 The Honky Tonk Man
 Jack Evans
 Jim Neidhart
 Juggernaut
 Kurrgan
 Kyle O'Reilly
 Matt Borne
 Mattias Wild
 Nova
 Puma
 Sabu
 Steve Corino
 Steve Rizzono
 Tito Santana
 TJ Wilson
 Tommy Dreamer
 Tony Kozina
 Kia Stevens
 Cheerleader Melissa
 Davina Rose
 Lisa Moretti
 K. C. Spinelli
 LuFisto
 Nattie Neidhart
 Olympia Hartauer
 Rebecca Knox
 Taya Valkyrie
 Lindsay Hart

See also
List of National Wrestling Alliance territories
List of independent wrestling promotions in Canada
The Weirdo Hero, film shot with the help of ECCW

References

External links
ECCW.com- Official website of Elite Canadian Championship Wrestling
ECCW Podcast
Solie.org ECCW title histories
ECCW title histories at Wrestling-Titles.com
ECCW poised for 10th anniversary celebration: British Columbia promotion has survived the test of time

 
1996 establishments in British Columbia
National Wrestling Alliance members